The 2014 BMW PGA Championship was the 60th edition of the BMW PGA Championship, an annual golf tournament on the European Tour, held 22–25 May at the West Course of Wentworth Club in Virginia Water, Surrey, England, a suburb southwest of London.

Seven strokes back after three rounds, Rory McIlroy won with a final round 66 (−6), a stroke ahead of runner-up Shane Lowry. It was his first win at the event, and sixth victory on the European Tour.	Thomas Bjørn led (or co-led) after each or the first three rounds, but fell into a tie for third after a final round 75 (+3).

Defending champion Matteo Manassero opened with an 80 and missed the cut by five strokes.

Course layout

Past champions in the field

Made the cut

Missed the cut

Nationalities in the field

Round summaries

First round
Thursday, 22 May 2014
Friday, 23 May 2014

Thomas Bjørn tied the course record, 62 (−10), with a bogey-free round that included eight birdies and an eagle. Two separate weather delays meant that the first round could not be completed on Thursday; 33 players were still on the course when darkness fell and completed their rounds on Friday morning.

Scorecard

Source:

Second round
Friday, 23 May 2014

Third round
Saturday, 24 May 2014

Final round
Sunday, 25 May 2014

Source:

Scorecard
Final round

Cumulative tournament scores, relative to par
Source:

References

External links
Coverage on European Tour official site
Wentworth Club: Golf

BMW PGA Championship
Golf tournaments in England
BMW PGA Championship
BMW PGA Championship
BMW PGA Championship